Liesel Litzenburger is a writer in Michigan. Her first novel, "The Widower," was published in August 2006. "Now You Love Me", a collection of short stories, was published in February 2007.

References

External links
Random House Books by Liesel Litzenburger
Brief bio on Ludington Visiting Writers

Living people
21st-century American novelists
American women novelists
21st-century American women writers
People from Harbor Springs, Michigan
Year of birth missing (living people)
University of Michigan alumni